The Cape Leveque Road is a regional Western Australian road that runs through pindan woodland for  between Broome and Cape Leveque on the Dampier Peninsula.

The southernmost  section was narrow-sealed, the northernmost  section (between south of Beagle Bay and its northern terminus) was sealed, and the middle  section was unsealed. During the wet season, the unsealed section was often closed because flooding made it impassable.

The road is vital for servicing communities on the Dampier Peninsula and is also a popular tourist attraction. The road is maintained by the Shire of Broome.

Upgrades
In May 2018, Main Roads Western Australia, an agency of the Government of Western Australia, started work to upgrade and seal Cape Leveque Road between Broome Highway and Beagle Bay. This work was funded under the Northern Australia Roads Program, with $65.7 million from the state and federal governments, and was completed in late 2020. It included both reconstruction and sealing of the southernmost section of narrow-seal and construction and sealing of the middle, previously unsealed, section.

See also

 Highways in Australia
 List of highways in Western Australia

References

External links
 Shire of Broome road report
 Western Australia parliament question & answer about future upgrades (27 September 2006)

Australian outback tracks
Roads in Western Australia
Kimberley (Western Australia)